BMK may refer to:

 Barbie Mini Kingdom, a doll line
 Big Mama King, a Korean singer
 Baja Mali Knindza, a Serbian singer
 Bulaimu Muwanga Kibirige, a Ugandan businessman
 M. Balamuralikrishna, a Carnatic musician
 Benzyl methyl ketone, synonymous of phenylacetone
 Brian Kibler, full name Brian McCormick Kibler
 Bare metal kernel, an operating system capable running natively on some hardware
 Beloretskiy Metallurgicheskiy Kombinat, a steel company in Russia

bmk may refer to:
 Ghayavi language (ISO 639-3 code), a language of Papua New Guinea